John Hashem (born May 15, 1987) is a former professional Canadian football offensive tackle. He last played for the Montreal Alouettes.  In 2010, he was signed by the Winnipeg Blue Bombers but was eventually released. He was drafted by the Calgary Stampeders in the third round of the 2009 CFL Draft. He played CIS football for the Regina Rams and was briefly on the roster for the Saskatchewan Roughriders

College career
Hashem played his college football for the Regina Rams. He started 16 consecutive games at Right tackle for Regina over the past two seasons. In 2007, the work of Hashem and his stellar offensive line colleagues allowed the Rams to lead Canada West with a 32.1 points-per-game average. In 2008, he blocked for conference-leading passer Teale Orban. In 2009 and 2010, he blocked for the Can-West Superstar quarterback Marc Mueller.
During his time on the Rams in 2009-2010, John played with 2011-2012 CIS First Team All Canadian Brett Jones .

Professional career
Hashem was drafted by the Calgary Stampeders in 2009, he was signed by the Winnipeg Blue Bombers  in 2010.

Coaching career
After playing, John started coaching at Leboldus High School in Regina.  His roles including Offensive Line Coach, Special Teams Coordinator and Offensive Coordinator. From 2011-2016 the team won 5 consecutive provincial championships.  In 2017 and 2018 the team lost in the city finals.  In 2019 John joined the University of Regina Rams as an Offensive Line Coach.

Poker
John has had numerous successes in live poker tournaments.  His most recent success was placing 98th out of 8600 players in the 2019 World Series of Poker Main event. Later that fall he placed first place in the SIGA Poker Championship in Saskatoon.

Personal life

Hashem was born in Regina, Saskatchewan to Shannon Hashem (a biochemist) and Simon Hashem (an engineer). He studied software engineering at the University of Regina while playing on the university’s football team, Regina Rams . He graduated in 2009 and started his professional football career  with the Calgary Stampeders. He is currently a coach with the University of Regina Rams, and a software engineer working as a web-developer.

References 

1987 births
Living people
Players of Canadian football from Saskatchewan
Canadian football offensive linemen
Regina Rams players
Sportspeople from Regina, Saskatchewan
Calgary Stampeders players
Montreal Alouettes players
Winnipeg Blue Bombers players